I Married a Mobster is an American documentary television series on Investigation Discovery. The series debuted on July 13, 2011 and ended its run on October 10, 2012.

Premise
The series tells the stories of the wives who were married to mobsters. Each episode includes reenactments, archival photos and interviews that depict the rise and demise of mob families from the first-person point of view.

Episodes

Season 1 (2011)

Season 2 (2012)

References

External links
 

2010s American documentary television series
2011 American television series debuts
2012 American television series endings
English-language television shows
Investigation Discovery original programming
Documentaries about marriage